Guderian is a German surname. Other spellings are Guderjahn and Guderjan. It is present in Greater Poland and Mazovia in the 19th century. Notable people with the surname include:

Heinz Wilhelm Guderian (1888–1954), German general and military theorist
Heinz Günther Guderian (1914–2004), son of Heinz Wilhelm Guderian

Further reading

German-language surnames